Sheri Jean Polster Chappell (born May 30, 1962) is a United States district judge of the United States District Court for the Middle District of Florida.

Biography

Chappell was born Sheri Jean Polster on May 30, 1962, in Wisconsin and attended Kiel High School in Kiel, Wisconsin where she graduated in 1980. Chappell received her Bachelor of Arts degree in 1984 from the University of Wisconsin–Madison after attending the University of Wisconsin–Eau Claire from 1980 to 1982. She received her Juris Doctor in 1987 from Shepard Broad Law Center at Nova Southeastern University. She served as an Assistant State Attorney in the Twentieth Judicial Circuit of Florida from 1987 to 2000. She served as a County Court Judge in Lee County from 2000 to 2003. From 2003 to 2013, she served as a United States magistrate judge for the Middle District of Florida.

Federal judicial service

On June 25, 2012, President Barack Obama nominated Chappell to be a United States District Judge for the United States District Court for the Middle District of Florida, to the seat vacated by Judge Gregory A. Presnell, who assumed senior status on April 1, 2012. On September 19, 2012, the Senate Judiciary Committee held a hearing on her nomination and reported her nomination to the floor on December 6, 2012, by a voice vote. On January 2, 2013, her nomination was returned to the President, due to the sine die adjournment of the Senate. On January 3, 2013, she was renominated to the same office. Her nomination was again reported to the floor on March 7, 2013 by a voice vote. The Senate confirmed her nomination on May 20, 2013, by a 90–0 vote. She received her commission on May 22, 2013.

References

External links

1962 births
Living people
Florida state court judges
Judges of the United States District Court for the Middle District of Florida
Nova Southeastern University alumni
People from Sheboygan, Wisconsin
State attorneys
United States district court judges appointed by Barack Obama
21st-century American judges
United States magistrate judges
University of Wisconsin–Madison alumni
University of Wisconsin–Eau Claire alumni
21st-century American women judges